Jacob Bicker Raije or Jacob Raije (August 15, 1703 – June 18, 1777) was a writer from the Northern Netherlands.

Bicker Raije was born in Amsterdam as the son of Jan Raye and Alida Catharina Bicker.  Bicker Raye was a member of the Bicker family through his mother, whose name he added to his own. He held a number of administrative positions in the local government of Amsterdam but is best known today for his diary, which was republished in 1935 and is listed in the Canon of Dutch Literature as one of the 1,000 most important texts of the Dutch language.

Raije died in Amsterdam.

External links 
 Online version of his diary: Het dagboek van Jacob Bicker Raye 1732-1772, published by F. Beijerinck and M.G. de Boer, 1935
 De polsslag van de stad - De Amsterdamse stadskronieken van Jacob Bicker Raije (1732-1772) door Machiel Bosman.

1703 births
1777 deaths
Writers from Amsterdam
Dutch civil servants
Dutch male writers